is a Japanese former film and stage actress. She was active from 1930 until 1965 and appeared in more than 115 films.

Early life 
Aizome's father died when she was 6 months old, and her mother died when she was 10 years old. After losing both parents, Aizome gave her possessions to her uncle and went to Tokyo with her older brother, where she went to elementary school.

Career 
In July 1930, Aizome dropped out of high school to join the Shochiku Kagekidan musical theatre revue. Her first role was that of a pirate in a play titled merry-go-round. She appeared on stage until she made her screen debut in Mikio Naruse's 1932 film Moth-eaten Spring, now considered lost. In early 1933, Aizome appeared in Yasujirō Ozu's Dragnet Girl. She then played Masumi, a prostitute and friend of the main character in Hiroshi Shimizu's Japanese Girls at the Harbor. In 1934 she appeared in her second and final Ozu film, A Mother Should be Loved. That same year she starred alongside Yoshiko Okada in the leading role of Yasujirō Shimazu's film Our Neighbor, Miss Yae, playing the main character Yaeko. She appeared in many more movies throughout the 1930s and 1940s, including movies by Mikio Naruse, Hiroshi Shimizu and Heinosuke Gosho. In 1947, she played the sister of Setsuko Hara's character in A Ball at the Anjo House. In 1953, she had a minor role in Epitome. She retired from acting in 1955, but in 1965 made one more film appearance in Yoji Yamada's Kiri no Hata.

In 1985, Aizome was interviewed along with her Our Neighbor, Miss Yae co-star Sanae Takasugi. She was last heard from in 2002, when she provided source material for a book on Japanese modernist films.

Personal life
In 1942, Aizome married Masanori Yusa, a two-time olympic gold medalist freestyle swimmer. Together the couple had a daughter, Makoto Yusa (born February 28, 1942), who became an actress under the name .

Selected filmography
 Dragnet Girl (1933) - Misako
 Japanese Girls at the Harbor (1933) - Masumi
 A Mother Should be Loved (1934) - Mitsuko
 Our Neighbor, Miss Yae (1934) - Yaeko
 A Ball at the Anjo House (1947) - Akiko Anjô
 Kiri no Hata (1965) - Yoshiko Ôtsuka

References

External links

 Yumeko Aizome at rottentomatoes.com

1915 births
Actors from Fukushima Prefecture
20th-century Japanese actresses
Possibly living people
Japanese film actresses
Japanese silent film actresses